Gordon "Gordy" Sheer (born June 9, 1971), is an American luger who competed from 1989 to the late 1990s. Competing in three Winter Olympics, he won the silver medal in the men's doubles event at Nagano in 1998.

Sheer also won two silver medals in the men's doubles event at the FIL World Luge Championships, earning them in 1995 and 1996. He won the overall Luge World Cup men's doubles title in 1996–7.

Sources
1994 luge men's doubles results
1998 Washington Post.com information on Sheer and doubles' partner Chris Thorpe.

FIL-Luge profile

United States Luge Association contact information

References

External links 
 
 
 

1971 births
Living people
American male lugers
Olympic lugers of the United States
Olympic silver medalists for the United States in luge
Lugers at the 1992 Winter Olympics
Lugers at the 1994 Winter Olympics
Lugers at the 1998 Winter Olympics
Medalists at the 1998 Winter Olympics
Sportspeople from New York (state)
Jewish American sportspeople
21st-century American Jews